Liubashivka is an urban-type settlement in Odesa Oblast (region), Ukraine, located of south-western Ukraine. It serves as the  administrative center of Podilsk Raion (district). Population: 

Town was founded in the 18th century. Liubashivka is primarily Ukrainophone.

Liubashivka is an important transport center and located approximately 160 kilometers from the region capital, Odesa.  The town lies on a route Highway05/European route 95:  Kyiv — Odesa — Merzifon.

Through the territory of the Liubashivka pass the railroad routes. A railway from Odesa to Kropyvnytskyi and a railway station were built here in 1868.

Many armies passed through town  in the period from 1917 to 1920, when Ukraine gained its independence from Russia for a short period of time. They represented different powers: Russian Bolsheviks, Central Council of Ukraine, Mahno movement  and the White movement. With the end of the war, the Communist Party assumed complete control of the country. The Bolsheviks leader Joseph Stalin launched a command economy, rapid industrialization and collectivization of its agriculture. 
The Stalin's Ukrainian famine (1932—1933), or Holodomor was one of the largest national catastrophes in the modern history of Liubashivka.

Until World War II the town had a Jewish community. In 1940 Jewish population was 2500. In 1990 Jewish population was only 5 persons.

During World War II Liubashivka was occupied by Romanian and German forces (1941—1944). 
In 1991, after the collapse of Communism, the city became part of newly independent Ukraine.

There are two schools, one hospital, a railway station, and a hotel.

Climate

See also 
International Highways (Ukraine)

References

Urban-type settlements in Podilsk Raion
Ananyevsky Uyezd